Alternosfera is an alternative rock band from Chişinău, Republic of Moldova. They started their career in 1998 in highschool with their first album, Oraşul 511.

History
The history of post-Soviet rock in the Republic of Moldova is a concise one. Since 1991, only a few bands (e.g. Zdob şi Zdub), managed to occupy solid positions on the show-business arena of the Republic of Moldova and abroad.

Alternosfera first rehearsed with their full lineup on December 13, 1998. Their first concert took place on 23 November 1999 in Chişinău. In 2001, the band made their first demo recordings in Chişinău, followed by more demo recordings in 2002 in Bucharest, Romania.

Both the lineup and musical direction have changed over time, as the band reached maturity and developed their own approach to alternative rock, with the keyboards "carrying" the entire tune. Their lyrics are most often about love, but also have social and political connotations. Alternosfera's sound is unique on the Moldovan market at the moment, their influences varying from 80's motifs to the Seattle alternative rock of the '90s.

Their specific melodiousness is also partly due to most songs having the classic piano "lead."

Alternosfera have performed on most of Chişinău's stages, taking part in the most important rock festivals in Moldova and were always well received by the public. In 2005 they performed in the Tuborg festival in Bucharest.

Like most Moldovans, the band members speak both their native language Romanian and Russian, except Vlad Hohlov, who is a native Russian speaker. While most of their songs are in Romanian, there are a small handful written in Russian, especially earlier on in their career.

In 2022 the band moved to Sibiu, Romania, due to concerns regarding the aforementioned Russian invasion.

Current members

 Marcel Bostan – Vocals, Keyboards, Guitar
 Marin Nicoară – Guitar, Keyboards
 Dumitru Costin - Bass
 Nick Russu – Drums
 Sergiu Aladin – Guitar, Keyboards

Former members
 Sebastian Marcovici – Bass
 Andrei Ciobanu – Bass
 Dumitru Costin – Bass
 Olga Vîrlan – Cello
 Vlad Hohlov – Drums
 Max Koporski – Drums
 Mîrza Vitalie – Violin
 Vitalie Chian – Keyboards
 Anatolii Pugaci – Drums
 Victor "Vikosh" Coşparmac – Bass
 Eugen Berdea – Drums

Discography

Oraşul 511 (511 City)

Release Date: 28 May 2005

Track Listing
 Drumuri de noroi (Roads of Mud)
 Oriental Monk
 Shadow
 Ikar (Icarus)
 1500
 Spune-mi (Tell Me)
 Picaj (Dive)
 Astă vară (Last Summer)
 Wamintirile (version 5.11) (Memories)
 Зима (Winter)
 Vreau să-mi dai (I Want You to Give Me)
 511
 Alternocrazy [Bonus Track]

 Record label: ART-SFERA
 Mixing & record :  September–December 2004, ADM-studio, Chişinău, Moldova 
 Sound engineer:  Andrei Lifenco
 Mastering: Feb. 2005, Studio МГСУ, Moscow, Russia.
 Sound engineer: Serj Bolishakov 
 Music & text :  Marcel Bostan 
 Arrangement: Alternosfera
 Producer: Artur Muntean

Visători cu plumb în ochi sau ultima scrisoare pentru femeia nordică (Dreamers with Lead in Their Eyes or The Last Letter for the Northern Woman)

Release Date: 16 June 2007

Track Listing 
 Drum de fier (Iron Road)
 Ne uneşte, ne desparte (It Connects Us, It Divides Us)
 Femeia Nordică (The Norse Woman)
 Poştaş (Mailman)
 Ploile nu vin (The Rains Are Not Coming)
 Închisoarea albă (The White Prison)
 Cocori (Cranes)
 Visători cu plumb în ochi (Dreamers with Lead in Their Eyes)
 Avion (Plane)
 Nu e nimeni vinovat (It's Nobody's Fault)
 Columb (Columbus)

The first single released from the album was 'Femeia Nordica' and the second one was 'Ploile nu vin'. The new album's sound is somewhat different from the music Alternosfera were writing earlier. First, because the new songs sound more mild, and, second, because all of them (unlike on Oraşul 511) are in Romanian.

Flori din Groapa Marianelor EP (Flowers from the Mariana Trench)

Release Date: 12 October 2008

Track Listing 
 Mariane Flori (Mariana Flowers)
 Flori de Mai (May Flowers)*
 Mariane Flori (JenyaSOLID Remix)
 Mariane Flori (Remix NMKY)

"Flori de Mai" is a romanian term that refers to what would be known in english as "Forget-me-nots."

Virgula (The Comma)

Release Date: October 2012

Track Listing 
 Drumuri Vecine (Neighbouring Roads)
 Lumina Lăcustră (Lacustrine Light)
 Virgulă (Comma)
 Aruncă-mi (Throw Me)
 Mută (Mute)
 2000 de ani (2000 Years)
 O lume la picioare (A World At Your Feet)
 Deja Străină (Already Estranged)
 Două Eve (Two Eves)
 Prea Departe Te Simt (I Feel You Too Far)
 Manole
 Ancoră (The Anchor)
 Sentință (The Sentence)
 Final (Ending)

Epizodia

Release Date: 14 March 2013*

Track Listing 
 Drumuri Pi – necunoscute (PI roads – unknown roads)
 Nepoata Lui Gagarin (Gagarin's granddaughter)
 Epizodia
 Singurătate (Loneliness)
 Armata (The Army)
 Rugi (Prayers)
 Fiara (The Beast)
 Văduva (The Widow)
 Trei Luni (Three months)
 Mai Am (I Still Have)

The album was purposely released on Pi day, as Virgula, Epizodia, and Haosoleum are all symbolic of Pi.

Haosoleum (Chaosoleum)

Release Date: 9 October 2015

Track Listing
 Drumul Tristetilor Part I (numere) (The Sadnesses' Road Part I (Numbers))
 Drumul Tristetilor Part II (bijutierul) (The Sadnesses' Road Part II (The Jewler))
 Cad Fulgi / SOS (Snowflakes Fall / SOS)
 Dialog K (Dialogue K)
 Punct (Period)
 Am Uitat (I forgot)
 Cheama-ma (Call out to Me)
 Sarmanul Dionis (The Poor Dionysus)
 Din Pacate (Unfortunately)
 Au Ploile Azi... (Today, Do The Rains Have...)
 Rasai (Rise)
 Haosoleum (Chaosoleum)

Arhitectul Din Babel (The Architect from Babylon)

Release Date: 3 July 2019

Track Listing
 Drumuri Dintre Noi (Roads Between Us)
 Timpul (Time)
 Rachete (Missles)
 Orice Gand (Any Thought)
 Amanet (Pawn Shop)
 Fantanile (The Fountains)
 Unu Doi Unu Doi (One Two One Two)
 Lucis
 Scrisori (Letters)
 Outro

New album (2023)
In autumn 2022 Marcel Bostan announced that in autumn 2023 a new album will be released. All material is already ready and is mixed by British recording engineer Adrian Bushby who won two Grammy Awards for his work on Foo Fighters sixth studio album Echoes, Silence, Patience & Grace in 2008 and on album The Resistance by Muse in 2011.

On 30 November 2022 Alternosfera released first single - "Bonjour Madame" - from future album. On 24 February 2023 - exactly 1 year from Russian invasion of Ukraine - the band released second single, anti-war song called "Imnuri de război".

References

External links
 Official website

Moldovan rock music groups
Musical groups established in 1998
1998 establishments in Moldova